Bran Ferren (born January 16, 1953), is an American technologist, artist, architectural designer, vehicle designer, engineer, lighting and sound designer, visual effects artist, scientist, lecturer, photographer, entrepreneur, and inventor. Ferren is the former President of Research and Development of Walt Disney Imagineering as well as founder of Associates & Ferren, a multidisciplinary engineering and design firm acquired in 1993 by Disney. He is Chief Creative Officer of Applied Minds, which he co-founded in 2000 with Danny Hillis. Apple's "pinch-to-zoom" patent, which features prominently in its legal battle with Samsung, was invalidated by the US Patent and Trademark Office in 2013 based on a 2005 patent by Ferren and Hillis for multi-touch gestures.

Early life
Bran Ferren was the only child of artists John Ferren and Rae Tonkel Ferren. He grew up surrounded by art, artists, and technology. His father, whose work is part of the permanent collections of many American art museums, mixed with painters including Picasso, Miró, and Mondrian before becoming an integral member of the New York School of Abstract Expressionists. His father was also personal friends with Alfred Hitchcock and created paintings for The Trouble with Harry and designed the nightmare sequence in Vertigo. Ferren's uncles came from the worlds of engineering and technology: Roy Ferren served as director of flight test for North American Aviation (later North American Rockwell) and worked on the B-25 Mitchell bomber, X-15 rocket plane, XB-70 Valkyrie, and B-1 Lancer bombers. Stanley Tonkel was a noted senior recording engineer for Columbia Records, who engineered recordings for artists such as Miles Davis, Barbra Streisand, Aretha Franklin, and Bob Dylan.

He first attended Hunter College Elementary School for gifted students in New York City, followed by a year at the American Community School, in Beirut Lebanon (1963-1964) while his father served as the first artist-in-residence for a U.S. Department of State cultural exchange program to introduce American abstract art to the Middle East. After returning from overseas, he spent three years at the McBurney School in New York City, and then the last three years of high school at East Hampton High School, in East Hampton, New York.

Ferren started his first design and engineering company, Synchronetics while in high school. He left high school at age 16 to attend MIT, but departed in 1970 to continue entrepreneurial pursuits. Despite his short stay at MIT, he was invited back by then school president Charles M. Vest to be a keynote speaker for MIT Technology Day 1996. Before his 21st birthday, Ferren had worked on TV commercials, films, and regional theater. He had also pioneered visual effects for arena concerts for groups such as Emerson, Lake & Palmer, Laurie Anderson, Pink Floyd, Roger Waters, David Bowie, Paul McCartney. R.E.M., Depeche Mode, and Foreigner, using pyrotechnics, audio, projection, and novel lighting techniques.

Career

Associates & Ferren
Ferren founded Associates & Ferren at the age of 25 to do work at the "crossroads of design and science and entertainment." One of the first projects was for Broadway play The Crucifer of Blood, a Sherlock Holmes mystery that starred Glenn Close and won Ferren a Los Angeles Drama Critics Circle award. The production featured a "shattering display of thunder and lightning", which got the attention of director Ken Russell, leading to Ferren's first prominent assignment as special visual effects director on a major Hollywood science-fiction film, Altered States.

He is a theater designer whose work has been seen on Broadway and London West End stages, Australia, and in touring productions world-wide.  He has designed the Special Effects and Sound for several Broadway shows, and is a long-term member of the Broadway stagehands union, IATSE Local #1. His theatrical special effects and sound design work for the Broadway productions of Frankenstein, Cats, and Sunday in the Park with George, were widely acknowledged for their groundbreaking special effects. Frank Rich said in his The New York Times review of Sunday in the Park with George:  "What Mr. Lapine, his designers and the special-effects wizard Bran Ferren have arranged is simply gorgeous." It was the first Broadway musical to utilize digitally-processed projection mapping (pre-processed, geometrically corrected 35mm film projection), a radio-controlled costume with a robotic endoskeleton, 20 kW xenon rotating-dichroic-filter light ray effects, and dazzling high powered lasers that broke the 4th wall, traveling throughout the audience. Frank Rich said of his work in Frankenstein, "Bran Ferren's special audio-visual effects are also impressive by theatrical standards" and Carol Lawson, said in The New York Times that "critics have remarked that Mr. Ferren's work on this play, which included the spectacular destruction of Dr. Frankenstein's laboratory by his monster, had the lavishness that audiences have come to expect in films, but have never before seen in the theater."

As principal designer of Associates & Ferren, Ferren went on to lead many high-profile projects, such as special effects for the Paul McCartney World Tour, R.E.M., Depeche Mode, Pink Floyd, and visual effects for Little Shop of Horrors. He was a technical consultant for the films Impostor and Fat Man and Little Boy, and designed the titles for Simon, Dirty Rotten Scoundrels, Guilty as Sin, and Little Shop of Horrors. In addition to special effects, they were considered leaders in advanced projection, simulation and laser effects technology, and provided customized equipment for dozens of major road tours, and stationary installations.

He also produced, directed, and was the cinematographer for the movie "Funny" (released in 1992), which received a Nomination for a Grand Jury Prize at the Sundance Film Festival, and nomination for Best Documentary at the Chicago International Film Festival, Gold Jury prize at the Houston International Film Festival (now called WorldFest Houston), and was featured in the Toronto International Film Festival Midnight Madness program, and at the Cleveland International Film Festival. "Funny" features over 100 individuals, from Dick Cavett to Frank Zappa, telling their favorite jokes on camera. It was distributed by Warner New Media, in LaserDisc and CD-ROM.

Ferren served as lead designer, engineer, and producer of the 50-state, 16-month tour of the Bill of Rights, which celebrated the document's bicentennial. For the tour, he designed and built the Bill of Rights Secure Transit Vehicle, which transported the fragile parchment document, as well as a 15,000-square-foot traveling exhibit equipped with state-of-the-art lighting, A/V, security, and safety systems.  He was the chief designer for the award-winning Columbus Center Hall of Exploration, a science discovery center, located at Baltimore's Inner Harbor in 1997.

In addition to their work in the entertainment sector, Associates & Ferren was responsible for developing many technologies for industrial and government customers in the areas of robotics, sound systems, vehicle systems, control systems, scientific research & experiment design, optical systems, and 3D machine vision, as well as moving lighting fixtures for Strand Lighting Inc. Mr. Ferren was responsible for the development of advanced lens and thin-film dichroic coating technologies for the Revo Sunglasses brand, and served in the role of Director of Research & Development for Revo, which established new performance standards for sunglasses including the first to incorporate Infrared blocking.  He did the lighting design and interiors concept for Ian Schrager's  "White" variation of Studio 54 in NYC, as well as invented the what is believed to be the first multi-monitor video wall, which premiered at the opening of the Palladium Club, also in New York City, in 1985.

He has been recognized for his unique approach working with directors in the design of special effects and visual effects across motion pictures, television, theater, concerts, and later in theme parks and architecture.  This was featured in a New York Times profile on him by Stephen Farber, when Paul Mazursky's film Tempest (1982) was released. In this article, Farber quotes Mazursky as saying he is "a Renaissance man, a figure from another time ... If you crossed Robert Oppenheimer and Monty Woolley, you might get Bran."

By the time Disney acquired Associates & Ferren in 1993, Ferren and the company had won an Academy Award for Science and Engineering as well as two Academy Awards for Technical Achievement. Ferren was also nominated for an Oscar for Best Visual Effects for "Little Shop of Horrors", and received a British Academy of Film and Television Arts (BAFTA) nomination for special visual effects. He is a voting member of both the Academy of Motion Picture Arts and Sciences (Oscars), and the Television Academy of Arts and Sciences (Emmys).

His entertainment industry projects at Associates & Ferren include:

Film visual effects, lighting, design
 Altered States
 Star Trek V: The Final Frontier
 Little Shop of Horrors
 Dirty Rotten Scoundrels
 Making Mr. Right
 The Manhattan Project (also actor)
 Tempest
 Deathtrap
 Places in the Heart
 Second Sight
 The Untouchables

Film direction
 Funny: A Bran Ferren Film
 The Light Fantastic – Corning Museum of Glass

Network television
 ABC News Primetime LIVE!
 ABC News: Day One
 CBS News - design consultant
 NBC News - technology consultant

Concert visual effects
 Pink Floyd
 Roger Waters
 Paul McCartney
 R.E.M.
 Rush
 Depeche Mode
 David Bowie
 Jefferson Starship
 Foreigner

Broadway visual effects, projection, sound design
 Evita
 Macbeth
 Rock 'N Roll The First 5,000 Years
 Cats
 Sunday in the Park with George
 Woman of the Year
 ELVIS! An American Musical
 Spookhouse
 The Crucifer of Blood
 Frankenstein

The Walt Disney Company
Ferren led the Disney Imagineering R&D group as Senior Vice President, then Executive Vice President, before eventually becoming President of R&D and Creative Technology for Disney, and head of technology for the company for 10 years. According to his former boss, CEO Michael Eisner, Ferren's mission was "to dream about the future and show us new and innovative ways to tell stories". Starting in 1993, he was the first corporate executive to receive the now-common job title of "Creative Technology", indicating responsibility for both creative and technical domains.  When Eisner interviewed him on his new talk show, Conversations with Michael Eisner, he said that he loved that Bran "pushed me against the wall, and pushed management" in the areas of creativity and technology. The idea to create the USC Institute for Creative Technologies, and its name (derived from Ferren's title at Disney), originated from discussions with US Army leadership (four-star general Paul J. Kern) on how to gain access to Hollywood entertainment industry expertise in high-technology areas such as computer-based Modeling & Simulation, and Virtual Reality.

Ferren supported Disney's Strategic Planning Group and had direct creative and technical involvement in a wide variety of design and technology projects for Disney Theme Parks, such as the Tower of Terror ride, the Test Track by General Motors, the Indiana Jones Adventure, the Virtual Reality Animation Studio, and many prime time television projects. He has had a 30+ year creative history collaborating with top Senior ABC Network director Roger Goodman, with dozens of News, Sports, and Entertainment division projects. His team was responsible for engineering the ABC Times Square Studios armored electronic-dimming soundproof window systems, robotic cameras, large on-air displays, and a massive curved LED ticker display.

In 1996, Ferren created the Disney Fellows Program which attracted some of the brightest minds in Computer Science, including Alan Kay, Marvin Minsky, and Seymour Papert, as well as astronaut Story Musgrave. The first Disney fellow was parallel-computing pioneer Hillis with whom Ferren went on to found technology innovation and design firm Applied Minds in 2000.  Applied Minds is now headquartered in Burbank, California, a few miles from Imagineering headquarters.  In 1997 Ferren and the Disney fellows were profiled in a major article in The New Yorker, by David Remnick, and in many other publications and news service including Bloomberg, and Newsweek.

In the 1990s, Ferren's research group at Disney developed many pioneering concepts, and produced demonstrations of these ideas and technologies, to familiarize Disney corporate leadership of their potential to transform the entertainment industry.  These included gaming box platforms, personal navigators, electronic books, theater-scale digital cinema, direct on-demand music and video delivery to the home via telephone networks (pre World Wide Web & broadband), interactive cable television, safe browsing concepts for kids, and hybrid on-line/theme park concepts.

While at Disney, Ferren developed a unique test for screening design & engineering talent, when he found that traditional Disney process of resume screening, reviewing bios, and interviews often did not identify the kinds of multi-domain savvy talent he needed at Walt Disney Imagineering Research & Development. Known as the Yellow Box Test, it asks the candidate to go through 100 or so items in the box, all selected for their uniqueness and interest. As featured in a 2003 article in Discover magazine, they are scored on not just how well they can correctly identify the items, but also their thoughtfulness in explaining how they would be used and why, material selection, sourcing, cost, viable alternatives, and the technical and design principles, and even aesthetics. The candidate is also evaluated subjectively as to their enjoyment of the process, speed, enthusiasm, thoughtfulness, and appreciation of technology. For example, do they elect to first start with the things they understand, or those they do not.

Applied Minds
Ferren's company Applied Minds L.L.C. (AMI) has been described as a "Willy Wonka and the Chocolate Factory" for geeks. AMI invents, designs, prototypes, and creates high-technology products, vehicles, architectural designs, and services for government institutions and Fortune 100 companies. For example, the Smithsonian American Art Museum selected Applied Minds as winner of an international design competition for the renovation of the Renwick Gallery's Grand Salon. AMI also spins off technology companies. Notable spinouts include Metaweb, purchased by Google in 2010 and cancer diagnostics firm Advanced Proteomics.

In his role as chief creative officer and co-chairman, Ferren serves as lead technical consultant, management consultant, systems engineer, engineer, and designer across multiple disciplines.  He has headed projects for General Motors, Northrop Grumman, Lockheed Martin, John Deere, Herman Miller, Intel Corporation, Sony Corporation, ESRI, the Smithsonian Institution, Genworth Financial, the Library of Congress, and several US Government agencies. He was the creative design lead at Applied Minds, for the Genworth R70i Aging Experience, featuring a novel computerized robotic exoskeleton to simulate aging with live audiences at venues such as the 2016 CES and then the Liberty Science Center, as well as Genworth Financial's new website. The R70i Aging Experience at CES received the 2016 Cool Tech award.

Ferren has been named inventor on over 500 current and pending US patents. His 2005 patent with Hillis for multi-touch gestures led to the invalidation of Apple's "pinch-to-zoom" patent, which Apple cited in its billion-dollar lawsuit against Samsung. His 2009 US patent #8381985 (assigned to Intel Corporation) teaches the use of two cameras and electronic image processing to emulate the function of zoom lenses within devices such as smart phones, where traditional zoom lenses cannot fit. Another of his patents was for contextual database technology associated with Metaweb, a company acquired by Google which became part of the Google Knowledge Graph.

At Applied Minds, Ferren has also been lead designer and engineer on a number of advanced Research & Development vehicle projects, for example:
 The KiraVan, the next-generation of the MaxiMog, also based on a Mercedes Unimog chassis. The vehicle is currently still in final construction and testing, but was recently the subject of an hour long Extreme RV's special on the Travel Channel, and a Vice Motherboard video feature that has been viewed over a million times. He has also given talks on the creative design, engineering, and technology aspects of large-scale Expedition Vehicles at several EG Conference (2013), and at ArtCenter College of Design in Pasadena.
 The MaxiMog, designed to support scientific explorations, research, and location photography anywhere in the world. In 2001, the MaxiMog was on exhibit for three months at the Museum of Modern Art in New York City.
 The SmarTruck II, an Army concept vehicle (TARDEC) for defense and emergency response, featured at the 2003 Detroit Auto show.
 GM-CDV Concept Demonstration Vehicle, a driving demonstrator built in the early 2000s, featuring new concepts in driver interfaces, navigation, seating, infotainment, LED lighting, 3D sound, and semi-autonomous driving assistance.

His architectural and interior design projects include the UCLA's Connection Lab, Lockheed Martin's Center for Innovation, known as "The Lighthouse", numerous projects for Northrop Grumman, and the U.S. Government, including inside the Pentagon.  He has been directly involved as lead designer for over 100 command centers for the United States Government and private corporations.

Recently, an Applied Minds team led by Ferren was hired by leadership of the Smithsonian Institution to help develop their digital strategy.

Public speaking, publications and appearances 

Ferren has an extensive public speaking career as a subject matter expert, that has spanned a wide range of professional, government, and academic audiences. His over 250 speaking engagements include Harvard's Center for Public Leadership, MIT, MIT Media Lab, MIT Sloan School, Wharton, The Smithsonian Institution, SIGGRAPH, the ACM/IEEE Supercomupting Conference SC98, The Art Center College of Design,  Florida International University 2018, The U.S. Council on Competitiveness, The Caltech Entrepreneurs Forum, The International Design Conference at Aspen (IDCA), The Aspen Ideas Festival 2015, NASA, The U.S. Army, The US Air Force, The U.S. Navy, UCLA, USC, National Academy of Engineering, NYU, Intel Corporation, Infosys, The AUVSI Driverless Car Summit, The Society of Motion Picture and Television Engineers, The Engineers' Council 2012, Two Optical Fiber Conferences (OFC-2007 & OFC-2017), The Engineers Council, The Electric Infrastructure Security Summit VII, Westminster Palace, London, The Global Grand Challenges Summit 2013, in London, The EIS Council World Summit VIII on Infrastructure Security, U.S. Capitol Building, The Smithsonian American Art Museum, The Smithsonian Digital Futures Conference, MIT FAB11 - 2015, The Museum of Modern Art (MoMA New York City) "Working and Living: The High Tech Nomad", The Institute for Foreign Policy Analysis, Inc. (IFPA) Fletcher Conference 2007, The Envision Confeerence, Two Geodesign Summits, RealComm IBcon 2015, TTI Vanguard, Techfire, The American Institute of Aeronautics and Astronautics (AIAA), TTI/Vanguard, The Aspen Ideas Festival, The GEOINT Symposium, The 2017 National Competitiveness Forum, 2018 Miyamoto International, Great Minds Series, several E.G. Conferences, has given multiple TED talks, the IEEE EZVO19 Innovation conference, and The Explore's Club Global Exploration Summit GLEX2019 in Lisbon.

He has delivered the commencement speeches to the California State University, Northridge - College of Arts, Media and Communication (2002)The University of Redlands- College of Arts and Sciences (2014), and the University of Irvine - Claire Trevor School of the Arts, the School of Education, and the School of Physical Sciences (2015).

He was one of the first lecturers and writers to discuss controversial internet-related topics such as the concept of networked human implants, and the idea that reading & writing could turn out to be a fad, to be replaced within 250 years by better and more compelling technology (enabled by what would then-be ubiquitous networked personal electronic technology). His ideas, work, and perspectives on innovation, are often cited by publications and media sources such as The New York Times, The Los Angeles Times, Wired,Discover, Broadcasting & Cable,  The New Yorker, The Association for Computing Machinery (ACM), Fast Company, PC Magazine, Macworld, CSPAN, KCET (Dreamland documentary), Aerospace America, The Los Angeles Times, Smithsonian, The Washington Post,  Newsweek, Broadcasting & Cable, ETCentric, Time, Forbes, Inc., Scientific American, American Cinematographer, The East Hampton Star, Theater Crafts/TCI, Live Design, Lighting & Sound America, Cinefex, NBC News/CNBC, Vice, CIO, Air Force Magazine, Strategy+Business, and Bloomberg. He can be seen and heard on multiple website and podcasts, expressing his ideas on a wide range of topics from autonomous vehicles, innovation, technology, creativity & curiosity, the future of computing, art & design, and tools.

He was one of the first technical experts to articulate the concept of emotional resolution (as distinguished from technical resolution) for imaging systems, in particular for cinema production. The concept being that increasing the technical resolution of a system, such as sharpness and contrast (MTF/OTF) above a certain point, may have the effect of reducing the effectiveness of the medium for storytelling, as excessive sharpness encourages the audience to concentrate on the details and flaws of the scene or process (i.e. set construction, props, effects, artificial lighting) or of a performer (makeup, blemishes, wigs), rather than to suspend their disbelief to engage more deeply in the story.  One can see the practical efforts to mitigate the undesirable effects of this phenomenon in the extensive range of options in diffusion filters and soft lighting used routinely in still photography, film and television production.  As an early advocate for self-driving cars, his popular 2104 TED talk: "To Create for the Ages, Let's Combine Art & Engineering", has been called a must-see talk for engineers, discusses the intersection between art, design, and engineering; and why technologies such as autonomous vehicles will permanently change our world; has been viewed over a million times.

He has often been invited to speak at significant US Government sponsored conferences, advancing his ideas on leadership & innovation, technology, acquisition reform, as well advancing controversial ideas such as suggesting that the US armed forces should get off as GPS/GNSS as their primary source of precision Position, Navigation and Timing (PNT) within a decade.

He has consulted for, and been interviewed on many TV shows and specials, for example; The Dick Cavett Show, ABC NIghtline with Ted Koppel, The Tomorrow Society, The Charlie Rose Show, CuriosityStream, Conversations with Michael Eisner, Dreamland and The Age of A.I. (2019-2020) Hosted by Robert Downey Jr.

He has authored articles for numerous publications including The New York Times Magazine, Encyclopædia Britannica, MIT Technology Review, The Journal of the Acoustical Society of America, Talking Back to the Machine (Peter J. Denning, editor),  The Journal of Museum Education, the Proceedings of SPIE, and Quartz. For several years, he has been strong proponent and thought leader in the emerging field of Geodesign as a powerful tool that he believes has the ability to transform the way we think about city, regional and global planning, the environment, and effectively mitigating the negative impacts of people and development on the natural world.

Advisory board memberships and related activities
Ferren's advisory work has included board memberships at the U.S. Federal Communications Commission, Securities and Exchange Commission, International Design Conference in Aspen, PBS Kids and the science magazine Nautilus. He has also served as a member of the Army Science Board for five years, the Defense Science Board, the Naval Historical Foundation Advisory Council, The USO Digital Advisory Council, The Department of Homeland Security, and the Chief of Naval Operations Executive Panel. Bran Ferren is a member of the advisory boards for the Jacobs Institute for Design Innovation at UC Berkeley, CuriosityStream, NanoMech, ReactiveCore. In 2016, he was appointed to Toyota Research Institute (TRI) senior advisory board for driving autonomy, artificial intelligence, and robotics. He is a member of the board of directors for NPR's The Loh Down on Science.

While serving as head of Creative Technology for Disney, and also a member the Army Science Board (ASB), Ferren played a key roll in the creation of what became USC's Institute for Creative Technologies.  As a science & technology advisor to Four-star Army General Paul J. Kern in Modeling & Simulation (M&S) he recommended creating a new entity in the vicinity of Los Angeles that would be anchored at a major university.  The purpose of this organization being to draw from the local talent pool, and its deep expertise in gaming, visualization, and UI/UX design.  When asked why it should be there, rather than say the DC area, he stated emphatically that to be successful in this new domain, the army "needed to be where the action is."  Under Gen. Kern's leadership, and with the help of Army funding, the ICT was established in 1999 at the University of Southern California (USC), and has become an important and sustaining resource for the Department of Defense in gaming, modeling, & simulation technologies.

Fine art photography
Two of his photographs have been accepted into the Smithsonian Museum for American Art permanent collection. He has presented and exhibited his artwork at 2008 the Entertainment Gathering (e.g.) Conference, and exhibited his photography and multimedia work at the Guild Hall Museum, East Hampton.  His photographs are part of several private collections, and he is completing the editorial work for a large format photo book project called Eleven Seconds.

Creative collaborations
In 2009, Ferren collaborated with Laurie Anderson on the exhibition "The Third Mind" at the Guggenheim Museum in New York. In 2004, he helped to develop a gigapixel image system and 360-degree cyclorama with artist/photographer Clifford Ross. He worked with Patrice Regnier and Carter Burwell on his film project TESLA. He had creative meetings with Jim Henson in 1988 about a Muppets theme park prior to Henson selling his company to Disney. Prior to the Disney acquisition, Ferren had been in discussions with Steve Ross, CEO of Warner Communications about his acquiring Associates & Ferren and collaborating with Alan Kay on advanced entertainment and gaming technology. He is cited as a senior inventor at the company Intellectual Ventures, headed by former Microsoft CTO, Nathan Myhrvold.  Myhrvold and Ferren are often cited as being close or best friends and collaborators.

Awards and commendations
 In 1980, winner of the Los Angeles Drama Critics Circle award, for Special Visual & Sound Effects, The Crucifer of Blood
 In 1980, winner of the Ahmanson Theater Award, for Distinguished Special Visual & Sound Effects
 In 1982, winner of Academy Technical Achievement Award for the first computerized lightning effects system
 In 1984, New York Drama Desk Awards for Outstanding Special Effects, Sunday in the Park with George
 In 1984, New York Drama Desk Awards for Outstanding Special Effects, Spookhouse
 The 1984 Joseph Maharam Foundation Award
 The 1984 American Theater Wing, Hewes Design Award 
 In 1986, Academy Award Oscar nomination for Visual Effects, Little Shop of Horrors
 In 1987, winner, Academy Scientific and Engineering Award, for the design of an Advanced Optical Printer
 In 1987, winner, Academy Technical and Engineering Award, for development of a laser Synchro-cue system
 In 1998 British Academy of Film and Television Arts (BAFTA) nomination for special visual effects.
 In 1998, Bran Ferren received the Wally Russell Lifetime Achievement Award in Lighting Design.
 In 2000, Bran Ferren received the Kilby International Award for significant contributions to society.
 In 2011, Fast Company added Bran Ferren to the list of "100 Most Creative People in Business".
 In 2014, Bran Ferren was presented with the US Intelligence Community Seal Medallion.
 In 2016, Bran Ferren received the Sir Arthur Clarke Lifetime Achievement Award for Imagination in Service to Society.
In 2016 Bran Ferren was the Theater and Tech Demo Area designer for the ESRI Corporate Headquarters Office & Auditorium, which received the American Institute of Architects (AIA) Inland California Chapter, Honor Award

In popular culture 
The final scene in the 1980s music video "Take On Me" by A-ha was inspired by the similar scene designed by Ferren in Altered States.

A popular 1980s MTV Television bumper featured a take-off of the final transformation scene in Altered States, designed and art directed by Ferren.

A 2013 Elle magazine article on Ashton Kutcher, referenced a "memorable birthday party" with Ferren and other friends.

References

External links

 
 

American chief executives in the media industry
Disney executives
Disney imagineers
Special effects people
1953 births
Living people
McBurney School alumni
Artists from New York City
Businesspeople from New York City
Academy Award for Technical Achievement winners
East Hampton High School alumni